The Bangladesh cricket team toured Zimbabwe in 2009. They played five One Day Internationals against Zimbabwe. Due to Zimbabwe's self-imposed suspension from Test cricket, no Test matches were scheduled; instead, Zimbabwe have entered a team in the ICC Intercontinental Cup. At the same time as the ODI series against Bangladesh, a Zimbabwe XI will play a four-day Intercontinental Cup match against Afghanistan.

ODI series

1st ODI

Bangladeshi captain Shakib Al Hasan won the toss and elected to field on an easy-paced track at the Queens Sports Club, Bulawayo. Bangladesh's opening bowler Syed Rasel got the tourists off to a good start dismissing Zimbabwean opener Hamilton Masakadza for a duck in the opening over. After five years out of the International game, Mark Vermeulen and number three Chamu Chibhabha, stabilised the innings with a second-wicket partnership of 25 from 37 balls, before Chibhabha was dismissed by Nazmul Hossain for seven. Joining Vermuelan at the crease was Wicket-keeper Brendan Taylor, and with the score on 2-25, looked to be giving Vermuelan support with 20 from 39 balls. Starting with a flicked boundary, Taylor was unlucky to be given out leg before wicket (lbw) to Shakib—after an inside edge—breaking the innings highest partnership (49). Joined at the crease by Charles Coventry, Vermuelan who was lucky to survive a lbw appeal off Shakib Al Hasan in the 13th over, went on to register his fifth ODI half century from 73 deliveries. Looking to be aggressive, Coventry was caught on the boundary with Mohammad Ashraful's first ball, after scoring 19.

2nd ODI

3rd ODI

4th ODI

5th ODI

Media coverage

Television
Ten Sports (live) – Bangladesh, India, Pakistan, Sri Lanka and Middle East

References

External links

2009 in Bangladeshi cricket
2009–10 Zimbabwean cricket season
2009
International cricket competitions in 2009